Amy Boyle-Carr (born 6 January 2001) is an Irish footballer who plays as a midfielder for Sligo Rovers and has appeared for the Republic of Ireland women's national team. She also plays ladies' Gaelic football for the Donegal county team.

Club career
Boyle-Carr is from Glenties. She played youth soccer for Lagan Harps and Donegal Town, and represented Donegal in the Gaynor Cup. In January 2017 she signed for Sion Swifts of the Northern Ireland Women's Premiership.

In July 2022 Boyle-Carr made a soccer comeback, signing for Women's National League (WNL) club Sligo Rovers.

International career
Boyle-Carr has been capped for the Republic of Ireland national team, appearing for the team during the 2019 FIFA Women's World Cup qualifying cycle. Impressed by her performances with the Republic of Ireland under-17s, Ireland coach Colin Bell named 16-year-old Boyle-Carr in his senior squad for two friendlies with Portugal at the Estádio de São Miguel, Ponta Delgada, in January 2018.

She won her first senior cap on 10 April 2018, in a 2–0 FIFA Women's World Cup qualifying defeat by European champions the Netherlands at Tallaght Stadium. Boyle-Carr had acquired tickets to attend the match as a supporter, so was surprised to be picked to play.

Gaelic games
As well as soccer, Boyle-Carr plays ladies' Gaelic football. In 2019 she decided to focus on playing for the Donegal county team.

Honours
Individual
 Employee of the Month at Circet January 2023
 Blue Peter Badge

References

External links
 
 
 

2001 births
Living people
Association footballers from County Donegal
Republic of Ireland women's association footballers
Republic of Ireland women's international footballers
Sion Swifts Ladies F.C. players
Women's association football midfielders
Women's Premiership (Northern Ireland) players
Donegal inter-county ladies' footballers
Ladies' Gaelic footballers who switched code
Republic of Ireland women's youth international footballers
Women's National League (Ireland) players
Sligo Rovers F.C. (women) players